There are 19 municipalities in the Canton of Uri in Switzerland.

In general, municipalities in Switzerland are grouped in districts, but Uri has no districts.

Mergers of municipalities 
The 19 municipalities of the Canton of Uri were mentioned in the cantonal constitution and any merger had to be approved by a cantonal referendum that would change the constitution accordingly. A referendum in 2013 approved with 57%, the removal of the names of the 19 municipalities from the constitution, thus allowing municipalities' mergers without the need of a cantonal referendum. The municipalities of Seedorf and Bauen were the first that voluntarily decided to merge. The merger took place on 1 January 2021, after approval by the population of both municipalities in a referendum in October 2019; the population of both Seedorf and Bauen voted in favor of the merger with 80% and 69% respectively

List of the municipalities

See also
Municipalities of Switzerland

References

External links
Municipalities of the Canton of Uri 

 
Uri
Canton of Uri